Speciose Ayinkamiye is a Rwandan politician, currently a member of the Chamber of Deputies in the Parliament of Rwanda.

Ayinkamiye represents the Western Province and she is from Rubavu District.

From 2000 to 2001, Ayinkamiye was a teacher. From 2002 to 2018, she worked in various positions in the Parliament of Rwanda: Hansard editor (2002–2009), committee clerk (2009–2014), and legal draft (2014-2018).

In September 2018, Ayinkamiye was elected to the Chamber of Deputies in the Parliament of Rwanda.

Ayinkamiye is on the board of KCB Bank Rwanda Limited. Ayinkamiye is on the Executive Committee of the Commonwealth Women Parliamentarians.

References 

21st-century Rwandan women politicians
21st-century Rwandan politicians
Members of the Chamber of Deputies (Rwanda)
Living people
Year of birth missing (living people)